Cetinje, the former capital of Montenegro, is divided into 24 local communities (Montenegrin Latin: mjesne zajednice, singular: mjesna zajednica), bodies in which the citizens participate in decision-making about matters of relevance to the community in which they live.

Local Communities within the Old Royal Capital Cetinje

There are three urban local communities and twenty-two rural local communities within the Old Royal Capital Cetinje.

Urban Local Communities

Urban Local Communities are subdivisions of the urban area of the city

Stari grad ("Old Town")
Nova varoš ("New Town")
Gruda - Donje polje

Rural Local Communities

Rural Local Communities are subdivisions of the parts of the city that lie outside of the city limits.

Bajice
Bata
Bokovo
Gornji Ceklin
Dobrska Župa
Dobrsko Selo
Dodoši
Drušići
Konak
Kosijeri
Ljubotinjsko-građanska
Meterizi
Njeguši
Rvaši
Rijeka Crnojevića (city settlement)
Trešnjevo
Ćeklići
Ubli
Čevo
Štitari
Žabljak Crnojevića

References 

 Local communities of Old Royal Capital Cetinje (official site)

Cetinje